Helena Jaklitsch (born 1 July 1977) is a Slovenian politician. , she is Minister without portfolio for Slovenian Diaspora in the 14th Government of Slovenia.

References 

Living people
1977 births
Place of birth missing (living people)
Ministers without portfolio of Slovenia
21st-century Slovenian women politicians
21st-century Slovenian politicians
Women government ministers of Slovenia